Norbert Juračka (born 3 January 1970) is a retired Slovak football goalkeeper.

A youth international for Czechoslovakia, Juračka was a squad member at the 1989 FIFA World Youth Championship and the 1990 and 1992 UEFA European Under-21 Championship.

References

1970 births
Living people
Slovak footballers
FK Dukla Banská Bystrica players
FC Baník Ostrava players
FC VSS Košice players
FC Petržalka players
Czech First League players
Slovak expatriate footballers
Expatriate footballers in the Czech Republic
Slovak expatriate sportspeople in the Czech Republic
Association football goalkeepers
Czechoslovakia youth international footballers
Czechoslovakia under-21 international footballers